Marghuzar, or Marghazar is a hill station located in the Swat District of the Khyber Pakhtunkhwa province of Pakistan, and is 13 kilometers away from Saidu Sharif. Marghuzar, translated as "green land", contains green valleys, cold springs, and mountains, including the Elum Ghar mountain. In 1940, the then Wali of Swat, Miangul Abdul Wadud, decided to build a summer residence there for himself which became the summer capital of Swat. The palace was named Sufed Mahal, translated as The White Palace. The palace has since been converted into a hotel. Marghuzar has a 200-year-old colossal chinar tree, which serves as a canopy for visitors. There is also a middle school and one primary school for boys and girls each, but there aren't any hospitals or clinics.

Queen Elizabeth II visited  Marghuzar in 1961 and stayed there for three days.

See also
Miandam - Swat Valley
Malam Jabba -Swat Valley
Madyan - Swat Valley
Behrain - Swat Valley
Kalam -Swat Valley
Utror - Kalam Valley
Usho - Kalam Valley
Gabral -Kalam Valley

References

See also 
White Palace (Marghazar)
Swat District

Hill stations in Pakistan
Tourist attractions in Swat
Tourism in Khyber Pakhtunkhwa